Laurelia novae-zelandiae, also called pukatea, is a large evergreen tree, endemic to the forests of New Zealand. Pukatea has 'toothed' leaves and produces small flowers. It is a species in the Atherospermataceae (formerly Monimiaceae) family, typical representative of laurel forest ecoregion.

Distribution
Pukatea is generally found in lowland forest and grows throughout the North Island of New Zealand, and the northern third of the South Island, usually where moisture is plentiful, such as in damp, lowland forests, gullies, and on the edges of streams.

Pukatea grows well in poorly drained soil, but is equally at home on hillsides. It requires a temperate to warm subtropical climate, but also a frost-free environment with only very slight winter frosts not below 24.8 °F (-4 °C), and with high summer heat. Growth is best on well-drained, slightly acidic soils rich in organic matter.

Description

Pukatea grows slowly to a height of 130 feet (40 m), usually 115 feet (35 m), and is the only New Zealand native tree developing large plank buttresses to support the tree's growth in swamp or shallow-soil areas. L. novae-zelandiae has specialized respiratory root structures called pneumatophores in certain waterlogged ground or mud. These fragrant trees are characteristic of the lower strata of the tropical rainforest. The tree has thin bark and a pale brownish-grey trunk that becomes attractively buttressed at the base. Its dark green, glossy, elliptical leaves are 2-3 inches (5-7 cm) long and have coarsely serrated edges and paler undersides. The odorous opposite leaves have oil cells in the parenchyma, and brochidodromous venations. Juvenile leaves and stems can be difficult to distinguish from another native tree hutu, to which it is only distantly related. Pukatea is a mostly dioecious species, male and female flowers are on separate individuals. Some specimens had a ratio as high as 100 male flowers to every female or hermaphrodite one. These results suggest that the species is not truly dioecious. The female and hermaphrodite flowers are very similar. The flowers are tiny, inconspicuous, and in small racemes. The star-shaped flowers are whitish with yellow glistening glands and scarlet anther flaps. The glands at the base of the stamens in L. novae-zelandiae secrete nectar that accumulates at the base of the flower. This attracts a large number of bees, blowflies, small flightless animals, and Bombyliidae to the flowers. The nectar is visible as a colourless liquid which has a glistening appearance to the outer faces of the glands. Nectar runs down from the glands and accumulates on the floor of the flower as a result of continuing secretion. The fruit are little pear-shaped capsules which contain numerous achenes attached to fine feathery strands which aid their dispersal by the wind. Often, only a few seeds are viable.

Uses
Historically, the light, but tough timber of pukatea has been used for boat building. The timber was used by Māori to create figureheads for canoes. It is rather soft, but very strong. It yields a pale hardwood that is difficult to split and will dent upon impact rather than break. Its wood is pale-yellowish, with growth rings, and is homogeneous and fine-textured. An extract from the bark containing the alkaloid pukateine is used in traditional Māori herbal medicine as an analgesic. The pulp of the cambium was boiled in water and the resulting liquid used for treating tuberculosis.

References

Further reading
 "STUDIES ON THE MONIMIACEAE II.The Floral morphology of Laurelia novae-zelandiae A. Cunn. (SUBFAMILY ATHEROSPERMOIDEAE)" by F.B. Sampson, in New Zealand Journal of Botany,  September 1969 Item 20: pages 214-240 - pdf format.

Atherospermataceae
Trees of New Zealand
Flora of the North Island
Flora of the South Island
Plants described in 1838
Plants used in traditional Māori medicine